Brett David Harper (born July 31, 1981) is an American former first baseman in Minor League Baseball.  He is the son of former Major Leaguer Brian Harper.

Career
Harper was drafted by the New York Mets in the 45th round of the 2000 MLB Draft out of Scottsdale Community College. He began his professional baseball career with the Kingsport Mets in 2001 and remained in the Mets farm system through 2007, raising as high as Double-A, where he played with the  Binghamton Mets from 2004–2007. In 2004 with the St. Lucie Mets he was named the team's MVP and named to the  mid-season Florida State League All-Star team, though he was unable to participate due to his promotion to Binghamton.  In 2005, he finished third among all minor leaguers in home runs with 36 and he was again named to the FSL All-Star team. He also finished second in the FSL's home run derby.

In 2007 with Binghamton, Harper was named to the Eastern League Mid-season and post-season All-Star teams while hitting .296 with 24 home runs and 88 RBIs.

He was invited to spring training by the San Francisco Giants in 2008 and spent the season with the Triple-A Fresno Grizzlies, hitting .315 with 20 home runs and 59 RBIs.

Harper began 2009 with the Las Vegas 51s in the Toronto Blue Jays system and hit .274 with 15 home runs in 79 games before he was released by the Blue Jays. He was quickly signed by the Los Angeles Dodgers and assigned to the Albuquerque Isotopes.

In June 2010 Harper signed a contract with the Yokohama BayStars for the remainder of the 2010 season with a club option for 2011.

He signed with the Diablos Rojos del México of the Mexican Baseball League for the 2016 season. He was traded to the Guerreros de Oaxaca on April 19, 2016.

Harper is currently Head Coaching Instructor of Canes Baseball AZ, a youth club baseball program in Scottsdale, Arizona.

References

External links

Minor league player bio

1981 births
Living people
Acereros de Monclova players
Águilas de Mexicali players
Albuquerque Isotopes players
American expatriate baseball players in Japan
American expatriate baseball players in Mexico
Baseball coaches from Utah
Baseball players from Salt Lake City
Binghamton Mets players
Brooklyn Cyclones players
Capital City Bombers players
Diablos Rojos del México players
Estrellas Orientales players
American expatriate baseball players in the Dominican Republic
Fresno Grizzlies players
Guerreros de Oaxaca players
Gulf Coast Mets players
Kingsport Mets players
Lancaster Barnstormers players
Las Vegas 51s players
Mexican League baseball first basemen
Nippon Professional Baseball first basemen
Peoria Saguaros players
Sacramento River Cats players
Sportspeople from Salt Lake City
St. Lucie Mets players
Tohoku Rakuten Golden Eagles players
Venados de Mazatlán players
Yokohama BayStars players